Szikora is a surname. It is the Hungarian form of Czech/Slovak Sýkora and Polish Sikora, from Proto-Slavic *sykora, meaning tit (bird). Notable people with the surname include:

 Ilona Szikora (born 1918), Hungarian athlete
 István Szikora (born 1964), Hungarian boxer
 Juraj Szikora (1947–2005), Slovak footballer
 Melinda Szikora (born 1988), Hungarian handball player
 Pavol Szikora (1952–2021), Slovak race walker
 Szilvia Szikora (born 1965), Hungarian speed skater

See also
 

Hungarian-language surnames
Surnames of Slavic origin